List of World War II monuments and memorials in Bosnia and Herzegovina includes Yugoslav monuments and memorials build on the territory of the present day Bosnia and Herzegovina.

History 
The Yugoslav authorities established several memorial sites between 1945 and 1960, though widespread building started after the founding of the Non-Aligned Movement.

Yugoslav president Josip Broz Tito commissioned several memorial sites and monuments in the 1960s and 70s dedicated to World War II battle and concentration camp sites. They were designed by notable sculptors, including Dušan Džamonja, Vojin Bakić, Miodrag Živković, Jordan and Iskra Grabul, and architects, including Bogdan Bogdanović, Gradimir Medaković. After Tito's death, a small number were built, and the monuments were popular visitor attractions in the 1980s as patriotic sites, and since the Yugoslav Wars and the dissolution of Yugoslavia, the sites have been abandoned and have lost their importance.

The list includes monuments and memorials built between 1945 and 1991, but does not include busts or other statues of individuals (see bottom).

List

See also

People's Heroes of Yugoslavia monuments
List of Yugoslav World War II monuments and memorials
List of World War II monuments and memorials in Serbia
List of World War II monuments and memorials in Croatia
List of World War II monuments and memorials in Montenegro
List of World War II monuments and memorials in North Macedonia
List of World War II monuments and memorials in Slovenia

World War II memorials
Bosnia and Herzegovina
World War II memorials